Potamilus inflatus, the inflated heelsplitter, is a species of freshwater mussel, an aquatic bivalve mollusk in the family Unionidae, the river mussels.

This species was called by the common name Alabama heelsplitter in the standard reference, Turgeon, 1998. Because another species Lasmigona alabamensis was also given that same name in that publication, this duplication of name caused some confusion. Therefore, the common name of this species was subsequently changed to "inflated heelsplitter".

This species is endemic to the United States.  It is an endangered species.

References

Fauna of the United States
inflatus
Bivalves described in 1831
ESA threatened species
Taxonomy articles created by Polbot